Kalewa Township is a township of Kale District in Sagaing Division of Burma (Myanmar). The principal town and administrative seat is Kalewa.  The Paluzawa coal mines are located in Kalewa township.

Borders
Kalewa Township is bordered by:
 Mawlaik Township, to the north,
 Kyunhla Township,  to the east,
 Mingin Township,  to the south, and
 Kale (Kalemyo Township), to the west.

Towns and villages
Auktawgyi,
Chaungzon,
Chingyaung,
Gaundi,
Gazet,
Hintin,
Hkonbyin,
Hmangon,
Indaing,
Ingon,
Inmatin,
Kado,
Kaing,
Kaing Shwedaung,
Kalewa,
Kanni,
Kazet,
Kongyi,
Kunbyo,
Kyauktan,
Kyaunggyigon,
Kyawdaw,
Kyawzin,
Kyudaw Chaungzon,
Kywegu,
Kywegyan,
Kywenan,
Laungmin,
Legyidaw,
Letpannginaung,
Manpagale,
Mankaw,
Masein,
Matu,
Mutaik,
Myittha,
Nammaw,
Nanmawke,
Naungput,
Nwedan,
Paga,
Pagyizu,
Paluzawa,
Paunggyaung,
Pawlaw,
Sabagyi,
Segyi,
Shan-in,
Shwedaung,
Shwegyin,
Shwewagaw,
Sinaingma,
Singaung,
Sizwe,
Tadichaungwa,
Taya,
Thanbaya,
Thetkegyin,
Thingan,
Tunhlaw,
Webon,
Welon,
Wetto,
Yawzu,
Ywatha
Kyawe That

Notes

External links
"Kalewa Google Satellite Map and Gazetteer" map of administrative area with listing of principal settlements, from Maplandia

 
Kale District
Townships of Sagaing Region